Mercedes Narcisse (born April 26, 1965) is a Haitian American nurse and Democratic politician from New York City currently serving as the New York City Council Member representing Brooklyn's 46th City Council District covering the neighborhoods of Bergen Beach, Canarsie, Flatlands, Georgetown, Gerritsen Beach, Marine Park, Mill Basin, Mill Island, Sheepshead Bay in southeastern Brooklyn.

Early life
Narcisse was born in Saint-Marc, Haiti, and was raised by her grandmother. When she was 17 years old, Narcisse moved to Brooklyn to live with her father, and attended Samuel J. Tilden High School despite initially not knowing any English. She then graduated from the New York City College of Technology, receiving a degree in nursing.

Career
Narcisse has worked as a registered nurse for over 30 years, and established her own medical practice in 2001.

2009 City Council campaign
In June 2008, with Councilman Lew Fidler prospectively term-limited in 2009, Narcisse announced her campaign for the 46th district of the New York City Council. The election was expected to be a contest between Narcisse and former Assemblyman Frank Seddio, who had once been Narcisse's political ally and was the godfather to one of her children. However, in October 2008, Mayor Michael Bloomberg and the City Council agreed to extend the city's term limits law, allowing Fidler to run for a third term; Seddio and Narcisse both chose to discontinue their campaigns.

2012 and 2013 City Council campaigns
When Fidler ran for the 17th district of the New York State Senate in a 2012 special election, both Narcisse and Seddio prepared for another run for his City Council seat. Fidler lost the special election by 12 votes, however, and thus remained in the 46th district seat until his final term ended. Narcisse continued running for the soon-to-be open seat, but Seddio halted his campaign, and Narcisse instead faced Assemblyman Alan Maisel, a Seddio ally. Although Maisel was white and the 46th district was plurality-Black, Narcisse could not overcome Maisel's name recognition and connections, and lost 60-40%.

2016 State Senate campaign
Narcisse launched her third campaign for elected office in 2016, this time for the 19th district of the State Senate. The seat was held by Roxanne Persaud, who had won a special election after the previous incumbent, John Sampson, had been convicted on federal felony charges. Narcisse won the backing of Councilwoman Inez Barron, who sought to challenge the Brooklyn machine from the left, but nevertheless lost to Persaud in a 75-25% landslide.

2021 City Council campaign
With her former opponent Alan Maisel term-limited in 2021, Narcisse announced her latest campaign for the City Council's 46th district. As in her previous runs, Narcisse ran without the support of the Brooklyn Democratic political apparatus, which instead aligned behind community board member Gardy Brazela. Narcisse did earn notable endorsements from several major unions and Public Advocate Jumaane Williams, and was seen as one of the race's frontrunners and its most progressive viable candidate.

On election night on June 22, Narcisse emerged with a large lead, receiving 36 percent of the vote to her nearest competitor's 16 percent. When absentee ballots and ranked-choice votes were counted two weeks later, Narcisse defeated runner-up Shirley Paul 64-36%; she declared victory on July 3. She won the November general election with over 63% of the vote and took office on January 1, 2022.

Personal life
Narcisse lives in Canarsie. She has four children.

References

Living people
Politicians from Brooklyn
American politicians of Haitian descent
New York (state) Democrats
Haitian emigrants to the United States
African-American people in New York (state) politics
21st-century American women politicians
21st-century American politicians
21st-century African-American women
21st-century African-American politicians
Women New York City Council members
New York City Council members
1965 births